Laurel Avenue Church of Christ is a Non-Denomination church belonging to the Restoration Movement Churches of Christ/Christian Churches located in Chesapeake, Virginia.

"The Laurel Avenue Church of Christ began with the separation from the congregation on Bond Street and Winsor Avenue in Norfolk, Virginia. This separation came about with approximately 25 members relocation to a fish market on Maltby Avenue. Shortly thereafter, the market burned due to faulty wiring and a move was made to the home of Mr. and Mrs. A.J. Dail also on Maltby Avenue. This move developed into the organization of an independent Church of Christ. The year was 1933 and the minister was Edgar Harden."

References

Churches of Christ
Churches in Hampton Roads, Virginia
Buildings and structures in Chesapeake, Virginia